Ann-Veruschka Jurisch (born 10 January 1972) is a German lawyer and politician of the Free Democratic Party (FDP) who has been serving as a member of the Bundestag since the 2021 elections.

Early career
From 2011 to 2018, Jurisch served as the managing director of Switzerland-based Ernst Schmidheiny Foundation.

Political career
Jurisch became a member of the Bundestag in the 2021 elections, representing the Konstanz district. In parliament, she has since been serving on the Committee on Internal Affairs and Community and the Committee on European Affairs. In this capacity, she is her parliamentary group’s rapporteur on migration.

In addition to her committee assignments, Jurisch is part of the German-Swiss Parliamentary Friendship Group.

References 

Living people
1972 births
People from Cologne
Free Democratic Party (Germany) politicians
Members of the Bundestag 2021–2025
21st-century German politicians
21st-century German women politicians
Female members of the Bundestag